The 33rd Saturn Awards, honoring the best in science fiction, fantasy and horror film and television in 2006, were held on 10 May 2007 at the Universal City Hilton Hotel in Los Angeles, California. They were hosted by Greg Grunberg and Jeffrey Ross. The ceremony also celebrated the 35th anniversary of The Academy of Science Fiction, Fantasy & Horror Films.

Below is a complete list of nominees and winners. Winners are highlighted in boldface.

Winners and nominees

Film

Television

Programs

Acting

DVD

Special awards

The Rising Star Award
 Matt Dallas - Kyle XY

The Filmmakers Showcase Award
 James Gunn - Director (Slither)

The Service Award
 Kerry O'Quinn - former publisher of Starlog Magazine

The Special Recognition Award
 Alien Xmas written by Stephen Chiodo & Jim Strain

References

External links
 The Official Saturn Awards Site

Saturn Awards ceremonies
Saturn
Saturn